Atlas Road Crew is an American alternative rock-southern rock band based in Charleston, South Carolina. The band was founded in 2011 by Taylor Nicholson (vocals, guitar), Dave Beddingfield (guitar), Max Becker (bass guitar), Bryce James (piano), and Patrick Drohan (drums) while they were attending the University of South Carolina.

History

In October 2012, Atlas Road Crew released their first studio effort Atlas Road Crew. The EP features five tracks produced by Mark Bryan of Hootie and The Blowfish recorded in Charleston, South Carolina. In February 2014, the group performed at Michele Clark's 16th annual Sunset Sessions alongside Needtobreathe, John Butler Trio, Vance Joy, Augustana, Ziggy Marley, and many more.

In February 2015, Atlas Road Crew released their first full-length studio effort, Halfway to Hopkins, independently. The album featured 10 new tracks. Four songs were produced by Rick Beato (Needtobreathe, Shinedown, Trey Anastasio); four tracks by Cory Plaugh; and two tracks by Jay Clifford. Halfway to Hopkins was recorded in Atlanta, Columbia, and Charleston. The band released its song Voices as a teaser to the album.

In June 2014, Atlas Road Crew appeared at the Wakarusa Music and Camping Festival. Later that summer, the band had its first TV song placement in MTV's Finding Carter with its song Bottom of Love.

The group was named one of LiveMusicDaily.com's top 25 artists to see in 2015. In a July 2015 album review, Relix Magazine said Atlas Road Crew showcases their "penchant for tight, punchy, Southern alt-rock" in album "Halfway to Hopkins".

In 2016, the band went on a 31-date European tour with visits to Germany, Spain, France, The Netherlands, Slovakia, and Belgium. They returned to the U.S. in March, supported acts such as The Drive By Truckers and Hootie & The Blowfish, and performed at Electric Forest Festival in Rothbury, Michigan.

In early 2017, Atlas Road Crew released a new single entitled My Own Way which was co-written with Steven Fiore (Young Mister).

Discography

Atlas Road Crew (2012 EP)

Halfway To Hopkins (2015 album)

My Own Way (2017 single)

Members

 Taylor Nicholson – lead vocals
 Dave Beddingfield – lead guitar
 Patrick Drohan – drums
 Max Becker – bass
 Bryce James – piano, organ, vocals

References

External links

 
 
 

2011 establishments in South Carolina
Alternative rock groups from South Carolina
Musical groups established in 2011
Musical groups from Columbia, South Carolina
University of South Carolina alumni